Hold That Co-ed is a 1938 comedy film directed by George Marshall, starring John Barrymore, George Murphy and Marjorie Weaver.

Plot summary

Former star quarterback Rusty Stevens believes he is being hired to be prosperous Clayton University's new football coach, but finds it is actually rundown State College in the same town that is giving him that job.

Gov. Gabby Harrigan, who is running for the U.S. Senate, has slashed State's budget so much that the school only owns one football. Rusty leads a student protest at the state capitol that ends up in a brawl. The governor's opponent in the Senate campaign, Major Breckenridge, capitalizes politically on Harrigan's unpopularity at the college.

Harrigan's bright secretary Marjorie Blake persuades the governor to retaliate by raising funds for State and proposing to build it a 100,000-seat stadium (to be named after him). She also recruits new players for State including a couple of tough wrestlers, promising them government jobs and $500 a game. State begins winning game after game.

As a publicity stunt, State even ends up with college football's first woman, co-ed Lizzie Olsen becoming the team's kicker. Harrigan publicly dares mighty Clayton to a game, challenging his adversary by vowing to quit the Senate race if State loses the game. Breckenridge has no choice but to accept.

All is well until Rusty reveals the unethical payment to players. A depleted State squad is overmatched during the game, but with the score 7-6 in Clayton's favor, on the last play of the game Lizzie snatches a batted-down pass in mid-air and crosses the goal line for a game-winning touchdown for State.

Cast

 John Barrymore as Governor Gabby Harrigan
 George Murphy as Rusty Stevens
 Marjorie Weaver as Marjorie Blake
 Joan Davis as Lizzie Olsen
 Jack Haley as Wilbur Peters
 George Barbier as Major Hubert Breckenridge
 Ruth Terry as Edie
 Donald Meek as Dean Fletcher
 Johnny Downs as Dink
 Paul Hurst as Slapsy
 Guinn 'Big Boy' Williams as Mike Wurgeski (as Guinn Williams)
 William 'Billy' Benedict as Sylvester (as Bill Benedict)
 Frank Sully as Steve Wurgeski
 Charles C. Wilson as Coach Burke
 Glenn Morris as Spencer

References

External links 
 
 
 
 
 newspaper advert for the film

1938 films
1938 musical comedy films
1930s romantic musical films
20th Century Fox films
American black-and-white films
American football films
American musical comedy films
American romantic musical films
Films directed by George Marshall
Films scored by Arthur Lange
Films set in universities and colleges
Publicity stunts in fiction
1930s English-language films
1930s American films